Silverfall is an action role-playing video game, developed by software company Monte Cristo for Windows.  A port has been made for PlayStation Portable.  An expansion for the Windows version of the game, entitled Silverfall: Earth Awakening, was released in 2008. Silverfall: Gold Edition was also released in 2008, containing the main game as well as the expansion.

Silverfall shares many similarities with popular games, Diablo and Diablo 2. It also has strong influences from Sacred.  Players choose a character from one of four races (Human, Elf, Troll, Goblin) and develop their "class" (fighter, archer, mage, etc.) by assigning various skills as they level up.  Characters can be either male or female, and gameplay will differ slightly based on the selection.

Silverfall is a quest-based game which centers around a conflict between nature and technology, allowing players to develop an allegiance to one of these areas, which allows the development of additional skills and the ability to use certain alignment-based items.  However, there is no 'good' or 'evil' side to aligning with either technology or nature, as both will have quests that require the player to perform dubious and altruistic acts.  A 'nature' player may be asked to kill the overseer of a group of workers who no longer want to pollute the world with their factory, and a 'technology' player may be asked to exploit natural resources that will result in a loss of the livelihood of a nearby people.  At the same time, either player may be asked to promise a union leader a bribe in order to break up a strike, to the detriment of his fellow workers.

Gameplay

Silverfall, like most other RPGs, has both campaign quests essential to the storyline and optional, secondary quests. Players are able to create and customize their main playable character  have the ability to take on NPC companions and summon various creatures (such as zombies, lost souls, robots and elementals) to assist them in their quests. All companions require that some quest be performed before they will join the player's party, and depending on the player's attitude towards them throughout the game they may offer more quests.  They will also initiate dialogues at various moments throughout the adventure, volunteering information on the area and/or their backstory.

Skills are broken up three into main categories that expand into their "skill tree" for the player to choose from that allow customization of play styles with emphasis on Magic, Melee or ranged combat. There's also attributes that are the basic  strength, constitution, agility and intelligence and as with most role-playing games, these four attributes have a direct impact on the way the player's character evolves and change what unlocks.

Items can be found as loot from killing monsters, bought from merchants or won as quest rewards with various qualities, as well as ranging in level, usually within a specific range close to the player's. All items are kept in the player character's inventory, and the inventories of their companions. Equipment can be delegated to several slots, thought the equipment a character can equip is dependent not only on their strength, but also on their allegiance.

Plot

The titular Kingdom of Silverfall is being attacked by an unnamed evil force, later identified as the Shadow Mage. At the end of the tutorial, depending on the player's actions the Archmage of Silverfall can either kill the Shadow mage or be killed by him, which then possesses the Archmage's body. The protagonist is among the refugees who have left during the attack and at the request of the Archmage's child, who is the opposite gender of the protagonist, undertake basic task in the surrounding swamp to protect the refuge camp and find supplies. When the safety of the refugee camp established, the protagonist is asked to go to the city of Cloudworks, a technologically aligned city in the middle of a desert, to search search of the Archmage.  After settling an ongoing labor strike upon arrival, the protagonist is granted access to Upper Cloudworks, where the King of Cloudworks requests they investigate a noble who has been acting oddly. While storming the noble's house, the protagonist finds she was also corrupted by the Shadow Mage, and is sent to a local robot factory to face-off against the possessed Archmage.  The killing blow against the possesed Archmage however is struck by the Archmage's child that had gone ahead of the protagonist. Though this leaves the Shadow mage able to possess the Archmage's child, who flees in their new vessel. 

The party then returns to the ruined Silverfall to find the water supply has been contaminated by the undead summoned by the Shadow Mage, and must be purified by Gaian druids. However, they have their own problems, with the cave they source the water from being inhabited by Beastmen.  The protagonist fight their way through the cavern to the Chieftain of the Beastmen, who refuses to supply the water until undead who were summoned there are cleaned out of their caves. The party returns to find the druid's village is being raided by elves corrupted by the influence of the Shadow Mage.  After this slaying the Elves' leader , the druids agree to bless the water, but ask that the protagonist too kill the Prince of the corrupt Elves to prevent further attacks. The party fight their way into the heart of the Corrupt Elves' camp and slay the Prince, who as he dies explains that the situation was manipulated by the Shadow mage, who persuaded the prince into attacking in exchange for land. The possessed Archmage's child appears, asking the protagonist to join them, but the protagonist refuses for the sake of the people of Silverfall.  Returning to the druid, the protagonist receives the water to cleanse Silverfall's supplies but as they return, their party finds the king has been killed, his crown stolen, and the rightful heir, the princess was kidnapped. The few clues left behind leads the party in Greybay.

The plot branches slightly based player's choice on how to reaches Greybay, either the protagonist is transported directly to the Greybay docks, which results in a fierce battle or they choose to walk, which takes much longer but avoids the heaviest fighting. Either way once in the Greybay docks, the party fights their way to a ship belonging to the Princess' kidnappers and kill the captain of the ship. On his body, directions are found to the Necroraider graveyard where the Princess is being held. The party then fight their way to the crypt of Iznahel, the creator of the Necroraiders. Upon entering, the party is met by a ghost, revealed to be Iznahel who taunts the protagonist with words he claims from the corrupted child of the Archmage. The ghost is met twice more before revealing the Princess has been turned into a ghoul, which the party slays, followed by at Iznahel, himself. Upon Iznahel's defeat, the protagonist finds records regarding the Shadow Mage, the records reveal, amongst other things, that a way to destroy it was forged and kept in Steelight, a town in the mountains. Fighting through snowy wilderness, the protagonist finds Steelight. Once there, they find that the current Duke of Steelight's health is rapidly ailing with his mother fears for the continuity of their bloodline. She asks the player to find the illegitimate heir, her grandchild, whom she exiled several years before. In exchange for finding the heir, the protagonist will be given the stone to save the Archmage's child. With little choice but to accept, the party attempt to track the heir in a icy labyrinth and find the heir's mother. Once the heir's mother is located, she tells the player that her son has been kidnapped by the frozen fey in another part of the labyrinth. Returning to the labyrinth, the protagonist's party tracks down the duchy's heir, finding he was used by the King of the frozen fey as a vessel of some sort. However the child is rescued and returns to Steelight to his grandmother,  who grants access to the ancestral tomb of Steelight's ruling family and points the party towards the founder of Steelight's grave. The tomb is overrun by undead, including the founder's own ghost, who drawn back to the world of the living by the terrible happenings that began in Silverfall. With the Ghost's help the undead of the area are defeated. 

Finally, the protagonist receives the stone to cleanse the Archmage's child from the corruption of the Shadow mage. The Archmage's child then appears to the protagonist and begs them to spare them saying the stone will kill them but the protagonist sees through the ruse and proceeds to save their friend. But victory is snatched away as after a heartfelt thank you, the King of Darkness arrives and kills the Archmage's child. It's here revealed that King of Darkness is the true mastermind of the problems befalling the world. The protagonist attacks in a rage, but fails to hurt him as the King of Darkness escapes while mentioning about bringing the God of Destruction into the world. The party returns to Silverfall seeking a way to stop the King of Darkness, and is told the only way to stop the summoning is to travel underneath the mountains and find the dwarves in league with the King of Darkness and kill him before he can complete the ritual. The passage to the subterranean kingdom is overrun by gigantic hostile insects. Once there it's revealed the King of Darkness is creating a portal in the dwarven palace and after a battle with the protagaist where he's mortally wounded, he manages to escape through it to Blaize, where he plans to use the temple to summon the God. The party follows him through, to find Silverfall's people and her allies have gathered and are about to launch a frontal assault, during which the player is able to fight their way to the temple, however it's too late and the Avatar of the God kills first the King of Darkness then attacks the party but is defeated. In the aftermath, the protagonist is declared the King /Queen of the Silverfall as the world is beginning to recovered and the land prospering.

Reception

Silverfall  received "mixed or average reviews"  on review aggregator Metacritic for the PC version based on 32 Reviews.

References

External links
SilverFall.net
GameRankings.com Reviews

2007 video games
Role-playing video games
Action role-playing video games
Cooperative video games
Fantasy video games
Multiplayer online games
PlayStation Portable games
Video games developed in France
Video games featuring protagonists of selectable gender
Windows games